This is the list of Winners of Jury's Special Award

See also
 Karnataka State Film Awards

References

Karnataka State Film Awards
1977 establishments in Karnataka